Sir Orlando Bridgeman, 1st Baronet, SL (30 January 1606 – 25 June 1674) was an English common law jurist, lawyer, and politician who sat in the House of Commons from 1640 to 1642. He supported the Royalist cause in the Civil War.

Life
Bridgeman was the son of John Bridgeman, Bishop of Chester, and his wife Elizabeth Helyar, daughter of Reverend William Helyar. He was educated Queens' College, Cambridge and graduated with a Bachelor of Arts in 1624. In the same year, Bridgeman became a Fellow of Magdalene College, Cambridge and was called to the Bar at the Inner Temple. He worked as barrister until 1632, becoming Vice-Chamberlain of Chester in 1638. In 1640, he was appointed Attorney of the Court of Wards in 1640, and Solicitor-General to Charles, the Prince of Wales.

In April 1640, Bridgeman was elected Member of Parliament for Wigan in the Short Parliament. He was re-elected MP for Wigan for the Long Parliament in November 1640.  He rallied to the royal cause and in 1642 assisted Lord Strange at Chester against the parliamentary forces. As a result, he was disabled from sitting in parliament on 29 August 1642. He was knighted by the King, Charles I, in 1643. From 1644 to 1646, Bridgeman was Custos Rotulorum of Cheshire. In 1645, he was Commissioner at the Treaty of Uxbridge on behalf of the King. He compounded for his delinquency in 1646.

On 30 May 1660, Bridgeman was made Serjeant-at-Law, and two days later Lord Chief Baron of the Exchequer. The following week, on 7 June 1660, he was created a Baronet, of Great Lever, in the County of Lancaster. From 1660 to 1668, Bridgeman was Chief Justice of the Court of Common Pleas, and from 1667 to 1672 Lord Keeper of the Great Seal, resigning because he refused to apply the Great Seal to the Royal Declaration of Indulgence, which he regarded as too generous to Catholics.  In 1668, he was a member of the New England Company. In his final years, Bridgeman appointed the priest, theologian, and metaphysical poet Thomas Traherne (c. 1637 – 1674) as his private chaplain at Teddington and supported the publication of his writings. Bridgeman died aged 65 in Teddington, Middlesex and was buried there.

Bridgeman was highly regarded in his time for his participation in the trial of the regicides of King Charles I in 1660, and also for devising complex legal instruments for the conveyance of estates in land. Among Bridgeman's most enduring inventions was a device for the 22nd Earl of Arundel, which led to the creation in the Duke of Norfolk's Case, 3 Ch. Ca. 1, 22. Eng. Rep. 931 (Ch. 1681), of the Rule Against Perpetuities. Following the Great Fire of London he was one of the judges appointed to resolve disputes about property arising from the fire.

Family
Bridgeman married twice, firstly Judith Kynaston, daughter of John Kynaston, on 30 January 1627 or 1628. They had two children:

Mary Bridgeman, married, firstly Sir Edward Morgan, married secondly Richard Hanbury
Sir John Bridgeman, 2nd Baronet (1631–1710)

Secondly he married Dorothy Saunders, daughter of John Saunders. They had three children:

Sir Francis Bridgeman, married Susan Barker, daughter of Sir Richard Barker
Sir Orlando Bridgeman, 1st Baronet, of Ridley (died 1701)
Charlotte Bridgeman (died 1694), married Sir Thomas Myddelton, 2nd Baronet, in 1677

See also
Bunbury Agreement

References

External links

The Twickenham Museum: Orlando Bridgeman
The Diary of Samuel Pepys: Wednesday 10 October 1660

1606 births
1674 deaths
Alumni of Queens' College, Cambridge
Baronets in the Baronetage of England
Chief Barons of the Exchequer
Chief Justices of the Common Pleas
Fellows of Magdalene College, Cambridge
Members of the Inner Temple
Serjeants-at-law (England)
Orlando
17th-century English judges
English MPs 1640 (April)
English MPs 1640–1648